Schenscher is a surname. Notable people with the surname include: 

Luke Schenscher (born 1982), Australian basketball player
Peter Schenscher (born 1962), Australian cricketer